This is a list of casinos in West Virginia.

West Virginia became the fifth US state to legalize online gambling when HB 2934 passed the State House in February 2019. The first legal online casinos launched in the state in July 2020. With a total of 5 land-based casinos in West Virginia (see table below), the new gambling regulation allows for each land-based casino to apply for a single online casino license, which permits them to have up to 3 casinos skins. This means there will be a total of 15 online casinos in the state of West Virginia.

List of casinos

Gallery

See also
List of casinos in the United States 
List of casino hotels

References

External links

West Virginia
Casinos